The 1997 Men's ASCM Sharp World Team Squash Championships were held in Malaysia and took place from November 10-15, 1997.

Results

Pool A

Pool B

Pool C

Pool D 

Nicol unable to compete*

Quarter-finals

Semi-finals

Third Place Play Off

Final

References

See also 
World Team Squash Championships
World Squash Federation
World Open (squash)

November 1997 sports events in Asia
World Squash Championships
Squash tournaments in Malaysia
International sports competitions hosted by Malaysia
Squash
Men